The 38th Vehbi Emre & Hamit Kaplan Tournament 2021, was a wrestling event held in Istanbul, Turkey between 18 and 20 June 2021.

This international tournament includes competition men's Greco-Roman wrestling. This ranking tournament was held in honor of the Olympic Champion, Hamit Kaplan and  Turkish Wrestler and manager Vehbi Emre.

Medal table

Team ranking

Medal overview

Greco-Roman

Participating nations
111 competitors from 11 nations participated.

 (1)
 (1)
 (6)
 (4)
 (15)
 (8)
 (12)
 (15)
 (3)
 (45)
 (1)

References 

Vehbi Emre and Hamit Kaplan
June 2021 sports events in Turkey
Sports competitions in Istanbul
Vehbi Emre and Hamit Kaplan
International wrestling competitions hosted by Turkey
Vehbi Emre & Hamit Kaplan Tournament